Diana Department Store is a chain of department stores in southern Thailand. It was a public company with a ticker symbol CGD and traded on the SET.

Background 

The company has three stores, one in Pattani and two in Hat Yai, Songkhla Province. It also has a chain of Di-Mart convenience stores in Songkhla and Pattani.

In 2006, Diana Department Store exited from the Stock Exchange of Thailand, sold under backdoor of DragonOne company. The old SET code was DIANA.

See also
List of shopping malls in Thailand

References

External links
 Corporate website

Department stores of Thailand
Companies listed on the Stock Exchange of Thailand